China Xinjiang Airlines was a Chinese airline owned by CAAC. It had its headquarters on the property of Diwopu International Airport in Urumqi. It was based in Ürümqi and had a secondary hub in Changzhou in Jiangsu province.

The airline was absorbed by China Southern Airlines in 2003.

History

In late 1993 the airline took ownership of the first of five 72-seater ATR 72s that had been ordered in May the same year. This event was a milestone for China Xinjiang Airlines as it became the first Chinese airline in taking delivery and operating ATR aircraft.  Xinjiang Airlines was evenly owned by CAAC and the Xinjiang Province and it had a fleet of two Antonov An-24s, two DHC-6 Twin Otters, one Ilyushin Il-86, eight SAP Y-8s and six Tupolev Tu-154Ms.  the president position was held by Zhang Ruifu, who employed 4,597. At this time, Almaty, Beijing, Changsha, Changzhou, Chengdu, Chongqing, Dalian, Fuzhou, Guangzhou, Guilin, Haikou, Hangzhou, Harbin, Hong Kong, Islamabad, Jinan, Karamay, Korla, Kunming, Lanzhou, Moscow, Novosibirsk, Qingdao, Shanghai, Shenyang, Shenzhen, Tashkent, Tianjin, Wuhan, Xian, Xiamen, Xining, Yantai and Zhengzhou comprised the scheduled destination network. In 2001, Boeing 737-400s were deployed on a new route linking Urumqi with Hong Kong.

China Southern Airlines (CZ) integrated both China Northern Airlines and China Xinjiang Airlines into its operations; the takeover had been approved by the Chinese authorities in October 2002. China Xinjiang Airlines IATA's code ″XO″ became replaced with the CZ one for domestic operations in early 2003. , the replacement of the XO code was extended to all the operations.

Fleet

China Xinjiang Airlines operated the following aircraft:

Notes

References

External links

 Xinjiang Branch – China Southern Airlines 

Defunct airlines of China
Airlines established in 1985
Airlines disestablished in 2003
China Southern Airlines
Chinese companies established in 1985
Chinese companies disestablished in 2003